West St. Mary High School (WSMHS) is a high school in unincorporated St. Mary Parish, Louisiana, near Baldwin. It is a part of the St. Mary Parish School Board.

Athletics
West St. Mary High athletics competes in the LHSAA.

References

External links
 West St. Mary High School

Public high schools in Louisiana
Schools in St. Mary Parish, Louisiana